The Ludlow Formation is a geologic formation in western North Dakota. It preserves fossils dating back to the Paleogene Period.

See also

 List of fossiliferous stratigraphic units in North Dakota
 Paleontology in North Dakota

References

 

Paleogene Montana
Paleogene geology of North Dakota